The Brain Machine may refer to:

 The Brain Machine (film), a 1955 British film directed by Ken Hughes
 The Brain Machine, a 1972 film directed by Joy N. Houck Jr., aka Gray Matter
 Alternative title for the 1959 American science fiction novel The Fourth "R"